This is a list of former accounting firms.

United Kingdom

A
Arthur Young & Co.
B
Binder Hamlyn
C
Coopers & Lybrand
D
Deloitte Haskins & Sells
E
Ernst & Ernst
Ernst & Whinney
N
Numerica
P
Peat, Marwick, Mitchell & Company
Price Waterhouse
R
RSM Bentley Jennison
RSM Robson Rhodes
RSM Tenon
T
Touche Ross
V
Vantis
W
William Barclay Peat & Co.

United States

A
Arthur Andersen
B
Beard Miller Company
H
Haskins & Sells

References 

Defunct accounting firms